Billings Refinery may refer to one of two oil refineries located in Billings, Montana:
 Billings Refinery (ExxonMobil), refinery operated by ExxonMobil due to be sold in 2023 to Par Pacific Holdings
 Billings Refinery (Phillips 66), Phillips 66 oil refinery